Rhabdoblatta is a genus of cockroaches in the family Blaberidae. It is found in East, Southeast and South Asia.  The genus contains 151 recognized species.

References

Blaberidae
Insects of Asia